TREC may refer to:
 Techniques de Randonnée Équestre de Compétition or Trec, an equestrian discipline
 Text Retrieval Conference, workshops co-sponsored by the National Institute of Standards and Technology (NIST) and the U.S. Department of Defense
 Texas Real Estate Commission, the state agency that governs real estate practices in Texas
 Trans-Mediterranean Renewable Energy Cooperation 
 Toronto Renewable Energy Co-operative, creators of the WindShare wind power co-operative in Toronto, Ontario
 T-cell receptor excision circles
 Trading Right Entitlement Certificate as defined in the Demutualization Act in Bangladesh